Tasquillo (Otomi: Maxei) is a town and one of the 84 municipalities of Hidalgo, in central-eastern Mexico. The municipality covers an area of 167 km².

As of 2020, the municipality had a total population of 17,450.

Municipal President María de Jesús Chávez died of COVID-19 on January 30, 2021. She took office on December 15, 2020.

References 

Municipalities of Hidalgo (state)
Populated places in Hidalgo (state)